John Everett Everroad (January 13, 1913 – August 2, 1984) was a Nebraska politician who served as the 28th lieutenant governor of Nebraska from 1967 to 1971.

Biography
John Everett Everroad was born in Columbus, Indiana January 13, 1913. He is the son of Griffa Everroad and Margaret Quinn. Everett graduated from Columbus High School and studied at Franklin College in Franklin, Indiana, for two years.  He moved to Nebraska in 1952. He was elected lieutenant governor in November 1966 and served from 1967-1971.

Everroad married Rubye Marie Baker November 6, 1936, in Ector County, Texas. He died August 2, 1984 at Omaha, Nebraska, buried at Forest Lawn Memorial Park.

References

1913 births
1984 deaths
People from Columbus, Indiana
Franklin College (Indiana) alumni
Lieutenant Governors of Nebraska
Nebraska Republicans
20th-century American politicians